State Road 419 (NM 419) is a state highway in the US state of New Mexico. NM 419's southern terminus is at NM  104 north of Variadero, and the  northern terminus is at NM  39 north of Mosquero.

Major intersections

See also

References

419
Transportation in Harding County, New Mexico
Transportation in San Miguel County, New Mexico